Da Club Phenomena is the first remix album by Armand Van Helden.

Track listing
CD album
"Funk Phenomena" [Original Version]
"Witch Doktor"
"Psychic Bounty Killas" [Remix]
"Donkey"
"Break da 80's"
"Allright"
"Hey Baby"
"I Feel It"
"Work Me Gadamit '96"
"Funk Phenomena 2K" [Santos PandEmonio Remix]
"Funk Phenomena" [da Hool Remix]

Release history

References

Armand Van Helden albums
1997 albums